In Mandaeism, tamasha or ṭamaša is an ablution ritual that does not require the assistance of a priest. Tamasha is performed by triple immersion in river (yardna) water. It is performed by women after menstruation or childbirth, men and women after sexual activity or nocturnal emission, touching a dead corpse, or any other type of defilement (ṭnupa). It is also performed after subsiding from unclean thoughts or anger at another person.

Rishama is another type of ablution performed by Mandaeans, in which the face and limbs are washed (similar to the wudu in Islam). However, unlike the tamasha, it does not involve full-body immersion in water. The rishama and tamasha ablution rituals, which do not require priestly assistance, are distinct from masbuta, which needs to be performed by a priest. Whereas the tamasha is a "self-immersion" in which devotees dip themselves into the water, during the masbuta, devotees need to be immersed into water by a priest, not by themselves.

The tamasha ablution is comparable to tevilah in Judaism and ghusl in Islam.

See also
Rushma
Ablution in Christianity
Ritual washing in Judaism
Ghusl in Islam
Five Seals in Sethianism

References

External links
The Worlds of Mandaean Priests (University of Exeter)
Tamasha (Cleansing)
Tamasha (Cleansing) and Masiqta (Death Mass)

Baptism
Mandaic words and phrases
Mandaean rituals
Ritual purification
Water and religion